The 1908 Open Championship was the 48th Open Championship, held 18–19 June at Prestwick Golf Club in Prestwick, South Ayrshire, Scotland. James Braid won the Championship for the fourth time, eight strokes ahead of runner-up Tom Ball.

Qualifying took place on Tuesday and Wednesday, 16–17 June, and the players were divided into two "sections." Those in the first section played on the first morning and second afternoon while those in the second section played on the first afternoon and second morning. After the 36 holes the leading thirty players and ties qualified from each section. The qualifying score of 163 was the same in both sections, and 65 players qualified. J.H. Taylor led the first section with a score of 150 while the Scottish amateur Robert Andrew led the second section with the same score.

The first round on Thursday morning was noted for its low scoring, especially on the first nine holes. Ernest Gray, from Littlehampton, went out in 31 and equalled J.H. Taylor's record score of 68 set at Royal St George's in 1904. Braid finished with a 70 after going out in 33, with Fred Robson in third place after a 72. Ben Sayers was amongst those in fourth place on 74 after he too went out in 33. In the afternoon Gray was eleven shots worse with a round in 79 while Braid added a 72 to lead by five strokes from Gray with Sandy Herd and David Kinnell a further stroke behind. Braid again played the front nine in 33 and although he took six at the 13th he had a comfortable lead at the end of the day.

On Friday morning, Braid began the third round badly. After taking five at the first hole, he followed with an eight at the third. Despite slicing his tee shot into the rough he tried to carry the Cardinal Bunker but failed. His bunker shot hit the sleepers and went out of bounds and, after dropping in the bunker, he hit the sleepers again, this time landing further back in the bunker. He finally escaped the bunker, played a further shot to the green and two-putted for an eight. Under modern rules, he would have scored nine but at the time there was no penalty stroke for "out of bounds." After this, he recovered well and finished with a 77, only three strokes worse than the best rounds of the morning. With Gray taking 83 and Herd coming back in 45, Braid, on 219, had extended his lead to six strokes over Ball and Ted Ray.

Braid had a final round of 72, the best of the afternoon to win by eight shots. His total of 291 was an Open Championship record, beating Jack White's 296 in 1904. After poor scores on the first day, Harry Vardon and Taylor were amongst the best scorers on the second day and finished in ties for fifth and seventh places.

Past champions in the field 

Source:

Did not enter: Jack White (1904), 
Harold Hilton (1892, 1897), William Auchterlonie (1893).

Round summaries

First round
Thursday, 18 June 1908 (morning)

Source:

Second round
Thursday, 18 June 1908 (afternoon)

Source:

Third round
Friday, 19 June 1908 (morning)

Source:

Final round
Friday, 19 June 1908

Source:

References

External links
Prestwick 1908 (Official site)

The Open Championship
Golf tournaments in Scotland
Open Championship
Open Championship
Open Championship